Mohammad Alim Uddin (14 February 1940 – 18 August 2015) was a Bangladesh Awami League politician, freedom fighter and the former member of parliament of Rangpur-4. He was elected at the first national parliamentary election in 1973.

Politics and career 
Uddin was elected as the founding president of the Nilphamari district Chatraleague on 1 January 1966. He was also the president of the Syedpuf Chatraleagu. He directly participated at the 7 March address of Sheikh Mujibur Rahman at the Suhrawardy Udyan. Alim participated in the war of liberation from the sector six. His father Doctor Badiuzzaman was shot dead by the occupying Pakistan Army on 12 April 1971. He was elected at the 1973 Bangladeshi general election at Rangpur-4 as a parliamentary member.

Death 
Uddin died of heart attack on 18 August 2015 at his household at Notun Babupara Moholla of Syedpur Upazilla of Nilphamari District. He was 75 years at his death. His wife Rabeya Alim is currently a parliamentary member of the reserved seat-23 of 11th National Parliament. His only son is Engineer Mohammad Rashiduzzaman. He has three daughters too.

References

1940 births
2015 deaths
Awami League politicians
1st Jatiya Sangsad members